James Cuffe, 1st Baron Tyrawley (1747 – 15 June 1821) was an Irish peer and politician.

Life 
Cuffe's father was James Cuffe of Elmhall and Ballinrobe Castle and his mother was Elizabeth, daughter of Sir Arthur Gore, 2nd Baronet and Elizabeth Annesley, and sister of Arthur Gore, 1st Earl of Arran.

From 1768 until 1797 Cuffe represented Mayo in the Irish House of Commons. In 1776, he stood also for Donegal Borough and in 1783 for Tuam, however, chose both times not to sit. He was created Baron Tyrawley on 7 November 1797 and was elected as one of the first representative peers for Ireland in 1800.

He was appointed Governor of Mayo, a position he held until 1821.

Family
Cuffe had two illegitimate sons Henry and James Cuffe with Sarah Wewitzer, a leading actress. She called herself "Lady Trelawny" but neither of their children was recognised by inheriting their father's title. James was M.P. for Tralee.

Lord Tyrawley's first wife, [Mary Levinge, daughter of Sir Richard Levinge died without issue in 1808. She was the daughter of Richard Levinge (1724-1783) and Alice Marlay. Both her grandfathers were eminent judges.

A tombstone was placed in Ballinrobe churchyard to Henry Cuff, who died 25 August 1811, son of James Cuff, Baron of Tyrawly.

A further tombstone in the same churchyard gives Right Honr. Sarah, Baroness Tyrawly who died 4 October 1820.

James Cuffe's own tombstone reads: "To the memory of The Right Honr. James Cuff | Lord Baron Tyrawly | One of his Majestys | Most Honr. Privy Counsil | Late Barrackmaster Genl. | of | Ireland | who died on the 15th June 1821 | Aged ___ years.." Having no legitimate sons living at the time of his death, his title became extinct.

References

1747 births
1821 deaths
Barons in the Peerage of Ireland
Peers of Ireland created by George III
Irish MPs 1769–1776
Irish MPs 1776–1783
Irish MPs 1783–1790
Irish MPs 1790–1797
Politicians from County Mayo
Irish representative peers
Members of the Privy Council of Ireland
Members of the Irish House of Lords
Members of the Parliament of Ireland (pre-1801) for County Mayo constituencies
Members of the Parliament of Ireland (pre-1801) for County Donegal constituencies
Members of the Parliament of Ireland (pre-1801) for County Galway constituencies